Wesley Marquette (born 8 January 1982 in Mauritius) is a football player who currently plays for AS Possession in the Réunion Premier League and for the Mauritius national football team as a forward. He is featured on the Mauritian national team in the official 2010 FIFA World Cup video game.

References 

1982 births
Living people
Mauritius international footballers
Mauritian footballers
Mauritian expatriate footballers
Mauritian Premier League players
Curepipe Starlight SC players
Mauritian expatriate sportspeople in Réunion
Expatriate footballers in Réunion
Savanne SC players
Association football forwards